The Conduct of Employment Agencies and Employment Businesses (Amendment) Regulations 2022 is a statutory instrument of the Parliament of the United Kingdom. The regulations removed Regulation 7 of the Conduct of Employment Agencies and Employment Businesses Regulations 2003, which prevented employment agencies from supplying agency workers to employers to replace workers taking part in official industrial action.

Background
The prohibition of the use of agency workers to fill the posts of striking workers was first created by the Conduct of Employment Agencies and Employment Businesses Regulations 1976, which were created by the then-Labour government with the powers of the Employment Agencies Act 1973. The 1976 regulations were replaced with new regulations in 2003.

In 2022, the United Kingdom saw the largest instance of rail strikes in the country since 1989, with more than 40,000 RMT members across 14 rail companies going on strike due to disputes over wages, working conditions and job security. The Transport Salaried Staffs' Association (TSSA) and ASLEF also announced strikes, leading to widespread travel disruption.

Unions in other sectors (including the National Education Union, UNISON, the Communication Workers Union, and the Criminal Bar Association) also went on strike, announced ballots for industrial action, or threatened strike action if pay negotiations fell through. Mick Lynch, the RMT's general secretary, called for a general strike.

Grant Shapps, the Secretary of State for Transport, set out the government's plans to limit the impact of the ongoing industrial action in July 2022, including ensuring a 'minimum service level' was maintained throughout strikes. The Conduct of Employment Agencies and Employment Businesses (Amendment) Regulations 2022 were some of the first of such measures.

Provisions
The regulations amend the Conduct of Employment Agencies and Employment Businesses Regulations 2003 to remove Regulation 7. Regulation 7 prohibited employment agencies from offering agency workers to replace striking workers or to replace workers who are moved to cover the duties of striking workers. It only covered official industrial action, meaning that agency workers could have been hired for wildcat strikes.

The regulations were made under the Employment Agencies Act 1973 which meant that the minister responsible is required to consult 'such bodies as appear representative of the interests concerned'. The government was criticised for using a consultation from a similar proposal in 2015 (which was later abandoned) to justify the regulations.

Passage through parliament
The regulations were created and laid before both the House of Commons and the House of Lords on 27 June 2022, and government motions to approve them were tabled the next day.

On 11 July, MPs voted 289 to 202 to approve the instrument, splitting largely along party lines with the Conservatives voting in favour and Labour, the Scottish National Party, Plaid Cymru, Alba and the Green Party voting against. The Liberal Democrats abstained. Only one Conservative MP, Alec Shelbrooke, rebelled to vote against.

In the Lords, the instrument was introduced by Lord Callanan, a Parliamentary Under-Secretary in the Department for Business, Energy and Industrial Strategy. Lord Collins of Highbury moved an amendment to the motion which noted the lack of sufficient required consultation, the opposition from unions, and the potential for the regulations to harm industrial relations and break international law, and condemned the regulations as "simply a political exercise". The amendment was defeated in a 96–80 vote, again mainly along party lines; Lord Balfe was the only Conservative to vote for the amendment.

Reactions
Kwasi Kwarteng said that the regulations would "provide greater flexibility to businesses" and were "good news for our society and our economy". Grant Shapps said that they were "an important milestone" in the government's plan to "minimise the power of union bosses" and that they would mean that future strikes would "cause less disruption". Jane Hunt, the business minister, said that the change was needed to repeal the "outdated blanket ban" on using agency workers.

Angela Rayner, the Deputy Leader of the Labour Party, called the regulations "anti-business and anti-worker". The Scottish Green Party called the change to the law a "disgraceful attack" on trade unions to "distract from [the government's] own catastrophic failings".

The National Law Review reported that there was "almost universal opposition" to the regulations but said that most stakeholders thought that they would have "very little practical effect". The British Medical Association strongly opposed the regulations, saying that the government's proposals were "deeply disappointing". Twelve trade unions prepared to file a High Court judicial challenge against the regulations, alleging that they violate Article 11 of the European Convention on Human Rights and the EU–UK Trade and Cooperation Agreement which committed the UK to implementing basic labour rights.

Usage
Harrods became the first major employer to threaten to use agency workers under the regulations, after a ballot for strike action was launched by Unite members on 11 August. Unite accused Harrods of trying to union bust and using bullying behaviour to prevent strikes. The company said that although it was not the "preferred course of action", using agency workers would mean that they could "continue to provide the experience that our loyal customers deserve". The Recruitment and Employment Confederation, the trade body for employment agencies, criticised Harrods for putting agency workers "in the middle of the dispute" and said the priority "should always be to negotiate".

In the run-up to the 2023 teacher strikes by the National Education Union, the Department for Education issued guidance to schools to "take all reasonable steps to keep the school open", including by employing agency workers under the regulations to replace striking staff.

See also

List of Statutory Instruments of the United Kingdom, 2022

Notes

References

United Kingdom labour law
2022 in British law
2022 labor disputes and strikes
Statutory Instruments of the United Kingdom